William Purcell may refer to:
 William E. Purcell (1856–1928), state senator from North Dakota
 William Frederick Purcell (1866–1919), arachnologist and biologist
 William Gray Purcell (1880–1965), architect
 William R. Purcell (born 1931), state senator from North Carolina
 William Purcell (priest) (1912–1994), Archdeacon of Dorking

See also
 Bill Purcell (disambiguation)
 Bill Pursell, American musician